Etlingera hemisphaerica is a monocotyledonous plant species that was first described by Carl Ludwig von Blume, and got its current name by Rosemary Margaret Smith. Etlingera hemisphaerica is part of the genus Etlingera and the family Zingiberaceae. No subspecies are listed in the Catalog of Life.

References 

hemisphaerica
Taxa named by Rosemary Margaret Smith